Ringarogy Island (Gaeilge: Rinn Ghearróige) is a former island in Roaringwater Bay, County Cork, Ireland that forms part of Carbery's Hundred Isles. Ringarogy is joined to the mainland with a bridge.

Demographics

References

Islands of County Cork